Hans Siegl (1944-1978) was an international speedway rider. He participated principally in Ice speedway and Long Track events.

Speedway career
He was West German champion in 1972.

World Longtrack Championship
 1971 -  Oslo (8th)
 1972 -  Mühldorf (4th)
 1973 -  Oslo (2nd)
 1977 -  Aalborg (2nd)

World Ice Championship
1970 -  Nässjö (11th)
1971 -  Inzell (13th)
1973 -  Inzell (9th)
1977 -  Inzell (9th)
1978 -  Assen (6th)

Death
Siegl died on 25 June 1978, in hospital 30 days after a serious crash in Linz.

References

1944 births
1978 deaths
German speedway riders
Motorcycle racers who died while racing
People from Fürstenfeldbruck (district)
Sportspeople from Upper Bavaria